Kim Kang-min (born December 2, 1998) is a South Korean actor. He made his debut with the television series Hot Stove League (2019–2020). He is known for his roles in the television series Hospital Playlist (2020–2021) and the web series To My Star (2021-2022).

Filmography

Films

Television series

Web series

Music video appearances

Awards and nominations

Notes

References

External links
 
 

1998 births
Living people
Mystic Entertainment artists
South Korean male television actors
21st-century South Korean male actors